Lorena Garcia is an American politician and community organizer from the state of Colorado who has served as a member of the Colorado House of Representatives since January 2023. She was appointed to the House by the Colorado Democratic Party after the previous incumbent Adrienne Benavidez resigned. Benavidez endorsed Garcia as her successor, and a vacancy committee chose to appoint her to the seat. Garcia won 56% of the committee's vote, defeating two other candidates. She previously worked for various nonprofits in Colorado and ran in the Democratic primary for U.S. Senate in 2020, but could not collect enough signatures to make the primary ballot.

References

21st-century American politicians
21st-century American women politicians
Hispanic and Latino American state legislators in Colorado
Living people
Democratic Party members of the Colorado House of Representatives
Women state legislators in Colorado
Year of birth missing (living people)